The following is a list of notable people associated with Toronto Metropolitan University.

Alumni and faculty

A
 Brad Abraham - screenwriter, RoboCop: Prime Directives
 Nasra Agil - civil engineer and entrepreneur
 Omar Alghabra - politician
 David Anaglate - Ghanaian Journalist, formerly head of the Ghana Broadcasting Corporation (GBC)
 Emily Andras - showrunner, Wynonna Earp
 Tom Anselmi - sports executive, former president and COO of Maple Leaf Sports & Entertainment (MLSE)
 Barry Avrich - film director, film producer, playwright, author

B
 Lida Baday - fashion designer
 Brian Bailey - mentor to designers on Project Runway Canada
 Liane Balaban - star of the film New Waterford Girl
 Glen Baxter - journalist, FashionTelevisionChannel, formerly with Citytv
 Marjorie Beaucage - Métis filmmaker
 Christian Becker
 Ralph Benmergui - radio and television personality, host of Friday Night! with Ralph Benmergui and Benmergui Live on CBC-TV
 Christie Blatchford - columnist for The Globe and Mail
 Susan Bonner - CBC radio and television journalist, anchor of The World at Six
 Kristin Booth - actress
 Rick Brace - president of CTV
 Kevin Brauch - host of The Thirsty Traveler
Tyler Brûlé - journalist, founder of Wallpaper* and Monocle (Did not graduate)
 Dianne Buckner - television journalist
 Alex Bulmer - playwright and theatre artist
 Edward Burtynsky - landscape photographer

C
 Jamie Campbell - Sportsnet broadcaster
 Gary Carr - politician, Chair of Halton Region, former Ontario PC Party MPP and Liberal Party MP
 Paul Chato - comedian and member of The Frantics comedy troupe
 Walter Chin - commercial photographer
 Milan Chvostek - TV director and producer
Chad Connell - actor
 Brandon Cronenberg - film director and son of David Cronenberg
 Cathy Crowe - "street nurse" and social activist

D

 Steve Dangle - Born Steve Glynn, CEO of SDPN, YouTube Creator for Rogers Sportsnet , sports analyst, author 
 Dave Devall - former CFTO-TV weather personality
 Nina Dobrev - actress, star of The CW show The Vampire Diaries and Degrassi: The Next Generation
 Yuri Dojc - commercial photographer
 Joan Donaldson - journalist, formerly of CBC, and CTV, founding head of CBC Newsworld
 Nicole Dorsey - director and screenwriter
 Raina Douris - radio personality
 Francis D'Souza - journalist, Citytv
 Michelle Duff - as Mike Duff, raced in World Championship motorcycle events

E
 David James Elliott - star of JAG

F
 Natasha Fatah - journalist and producer, CBC Radio One
 Gemma Files - horror writer
 Sunny Fong - fashion designer
 Kyle Forgeard - YouTuber and co-founder of NELK
 Matthew Fraser - editor-in-chief of National Post
 J.M. Frey, science fiction and fantasy writer
 Michael Friscolanti - senior writer for Maclean's magazine, and author
 Gayleen Froese - horror/mystery author
 Liza Fromer - former co-host of Breakfast Television on Citytv

G
 Tony Gagliano - president of St. Joseph Communications; chairman of the Art Gallery of Ontario; winner of Canadian of the Year 2008
 Martine Gaillard - sports anchor on Rogers Sportsnet, formerly with The Score
 Sue Gardner - executive director of the Wikimedia Foundation
 Martin Gero - writer and producer, Stargate Atlantis
 Shelley Gillen - producer, screenwriter and songwriter
 Natalie Glebova - Miss Universe 2005
 Paul Godfrey - Canadian politician and businessman (honorary)
 Olivia Grange - Minister of Youth, Sports and Culture in Jamaica, Member of Jamaican Parliament
 Simina Grigoriu (born 1981), Romanian born Canadian-German electronic musician

H
 Kimberly Halkett - Al Jazeera's White House correspondent
 Alicia K. Harris - director and screenwriter
 Bill Haugland - Canadian journalist and former news anchor for CFCF-TV in Montreal
 Hayden - folk singer-songwriter
 Michael Healey - playwright
Helen Anne Henderson - journalist and disability rights advocate
 Jessica Holmes - comedian-actress on Royal Canadian Air Farce
 Zoe Leigh Hopkins - filmmaker, actor; her 2004film Prayer for a Good Day premiered at Sundance Film Festival
 Kenneth Joel Hotz - filmmaker, actor, journalist, photographer, writer; Kenny vs. Spenny and South Park
 Tanya Huff - fantasy author
 Ross Hull - star of the TV series Student Bodies
Paul Hunter - television journalism, CBC News

J
Sabrina Jalees - comedian
 Maureen Jennings, novelist
 Jason Jones - The Daily Show correspondent
 Jim Jones - city councillor, former Member of the Canadian Parliament

K
 Kate Kelton - actress
 Michael Kennedy - film and television director, Little Mosque on the Prairie
 Gail Kim - professional wrestler
 Tanya Kim - entertainment news journalist, TV host
 Nil Köksal - journalist, CBC Television
 Julia Kwan - Canadian screenwriter and director

L
 Jeremy Laing - fashion designer, won a scholarship to Toronto Metropolitan and now shows at New York Fashion Week
 Michael Landsberg - Host of TSN's Off The Record 
 Hawick Lau - actor
 Jack Layton - former Toronto Metropolitan politics professor; former leader of the NDP
 Gregory Levey - professor, entrepreneur, author
Dan Levy - actor, director Schitt's Creek
 Todd Lynn - fashion designer

M
 Marcia MacMillan - anchor, CTV News Channel 
 Sam Maggs - author, entertainment journalist, and comic book and video game writer
 Heather Mallick - columnist and author, formerly with The Globe and Mail
Mena Massoud - actor cast to play Aladdin in Disney's live-action remake of Aladdin.
 Steve McAllister - sports editor for Yahoo! Canada, formerly with The Globe and Mail
 Stuart McLean - Canadian radio broadcaster, humorist, monologist, and author
 Eric McCormack - Emmy Award winner, star of Will & Grace
 Bruce McDonald - feature film and television director, Hard Core Logo, Pontypool and The Tracey Fragments
 Haley McGee - actress and playwright
 Debra McGrath - actress and comedian
 Denis McGrath - screenwriter (Across the River to Motor City, Skyland, Charlie Jade)
 Bob McKenzie - sports broadcaster on TSN, formerly of The Hockey News and The Toronto Star
 Carol Anne Meehan - anchor of CTV Ottawa
 Suhana Meharchand - television host and journalist, CBC
 Wendy Mesley - television anchor and host, CBC
 Ari Millen - actor (Orphan Black)
 Pat Mills - director and screenwriter
 Shay Mitchell - actress Pretty Little Liars
 Michelle Mohabeer - filmmaker, film professor
 Andrew Moir - filmmaker
 Christopher Moloney - writer and photographer
 Scott Moore - sports television executive at CTV/Rogers Sportsnet, CBC Sports, and Hockey Night in Canada
 Erdem Moralıoğlu - fashion designer
 Ted Moses - politician
 Joseph Motiki - television personality, former co-host of the TVOKids Crawlspace
 Jasmin Mozaffari - film director and screenwriter

N
 Zarqa Nawaz - creator of Little Mosque on the Prairie

O
 Candice Olson - host of Divine Design
 Jay Onrait - TSN SportsCentre host
 Terry O'Reilly - host of Under the Influence on CBC Radio One

P
 Dominic Panganiban - Filipino-Canadian YouTuber and animator known for his YouTube channel "Domics"
 Tony Parsons - broadcaster, formerly of CTV and CHUM, former host of Canada Tonight on Global
 John Paskievich - Genie Award-winning filmmaker
 Keith Pelley - sports media executive
 Marian Penner Bancroft - artist and photographer
 Louise Penny - mystery novelist 
 David J. Phillips - actor and producer
 Jeremy Podeswa - film and television director
 Valerie Pringle - broadcaster, former co-host of Canada AM

R
Monita Rajpal - news anchor for CNN International
 Mario Racco - Councillor in the City of Vaughan and former Ontario MPP for Thornhill
 Keerthi Reddy - Indian Bollywood and Tollywood actress
Bill Reid - Haida artist and wood carver
 Cabbie Richards - TSN personality
 Robert D. Richards - space entrepreneur, co-founder of the International Space University (ISU)
 Paul Romanuk - sportscaster
 Rob Rusnov - Olympic competitor for Canada in archery
 Lauren Riihimaki - YouTube Celebrity
 Katherine Ryan - Comedian, writer, presenter and actress based in the United Kingdom

S
 Robert J. Sawyer - Hugo Award-winning science-fiction writer
 Kenn Scott - WGC award-winning screenwriter
 Doug Sellars - sports television executive for CBC Sports and Fox Sports
 Isadore Sharp - founder of the Four Seasons Hotels and Resorts
 Mike Sheerin - Gemini nominated documentary director (Secret Mulroney Tapes)
 Hannah Simone - MuchMusic VJ; actor on New Girl
 Alison Smith - journalist, CBC Newsworld
 Graeme Smith - Moscow bureau chief for The Globe and Mail
 Cliff Solway - producer and director, CBC Television
 Jaime Stein - Canadian sports broadcaster and digital media specialist
 Brian Stewart - Senior Correspondent, The National, CBC News
 Tyler Stewart - musician, drummer for the Barenaked Ladies
 Patty Sullivan - children's television host, Kids' CBC
 Chris Stiliadis - Commercial music producer & rapper

T
 Betty Thompson - news presenter at CKCO in Kitchener, Ontario

V
 Nia Vardalos - writer and actress, Academy Award-nominated writer and star of My Big Fat Greek Wedding 
 Adam Vaughan - Member of the Canadian Parliament; former city councillor for Ward 20 Trinity—Spadina; journalist, formerly of Citytv and CKLN-FM
 Adnan Virk - sports anchor for ESPN

W
 Wendy Walsh - clinical psychotherapist, Ph.D.
 Isobel Warren - journalist
 Torri Webster - actress, star of TV series Life with Boys
 Tonya Lee Williams - actress, notably of The Young and the Restless
 Jeff Wincott - actor of TV series Night Heat and Sons Of Anarchy
 Klaus Woerner - founder and former CEO of ATS Automation Tooling Systems Inc.; 1997 Canadian Entrepreneur of the Year
 Ellen Wong - actress
 Jacqueline MacInnes Wood - actress, star of CBS show The Bold and the Beautiful

Y
 Elizabeth Yake - filmmaker
 Donna E. Young Dean of School of Law
 Marcia Young - broadcast journalist, host of The World This Hour on CBC Radio

Chancellors
Honourable David Crombie 1994 – 1999
John Craig Eaton - 1999 – 2006
G. Raymond Chang 2006 – 2012
Lawrence Bloomberg 2012 – 2018
Janice Fukakusa 2018 – present

Principal
Howard Hillen Kerr 1948 –1966

Presidents
Frederick Jorgenson 1966 –1969
 Anthony Wilkinson 1969 –1970
Donald Mordell 1970 –1974
George Korey 1974 –1975
Walter Pitman 1975 –1980
Brian Segal 1980 –1988
Terrence Wyly Grier 1988 –1990
Dennis Mock (acting Aug –Jan) 1990 –1991
Terrence Wyly Grier 1991 –1995
Claude Lajeunesse 1995 –2005
Sheldon Levy 2005 –2015
Mohamed Lachemi 2015 –Present

Faculty 
In November 2005, Professor Arne Kislenko won TVOntario's first Best Lecturer Series. In 2006, Toronto Metropolitan University had two professors in the semi-finals for TVO's second Best Lecturer Competition. Philosophy professor Dr. James Cunningham, and radio and television arts professor Dana Lee were semi-finalists. In 2006, Greg Inwood, professor in the department of Politics and Public Administration, was awarded the prestigious Donald Smiley Prize for his book Continentalizing Canada: The Politics and Legacy of the Macdonald Royal Commission. Criminal justice history and international relations professor Peter Vronsky published Serial Killers: The Method and Madness of Monsters (2004), a bestselling history of serial homicide, and more recently a controversial history of Canada's first modern battle, Ridgeway: The American Fenian Invasion and the 1866 Battle That Made Canada (2011).

References

Toronto Metropolitan University
 
Toronto Metropolitan University